Thomas Sydney Smith was an Indian lawyer who served as the Advocate General of Madras Presidency (now known as Tamil Nadu, India) from 1861 to 1863. He was ex-officio a member of the Madras Legislative Council.

References 

Year of birth missing
Year of death missing
20th-century Indian lawyers
Advocates General for Tamil Nadu
Members of the Madras Legislative Council